A Complete Concordance to the Holy Scriptures, generally known as Cruden's Concordance, is a concordance of the King James Bible (KJV) that was singlehandedly created by Alexander Cruden (1699–1770). The Concordance was first published in 1737 and has not been out of print since then.
Two editions of the Concordance appeared during his lifetime, 1761 and 1769.
(Reference 1955 edition)
Cruden's concordance was first published in 1737, one of the first copies being personally presented to Queen Caroline on November 3, 1737. Cruden began work on his concordance in 1735 whilst a bookseller in London. Cruden worked alone from 7am to 1am every day and completed the bulk of the work in less than a year. The proofreading and layout took a little longer. His brain was occupied with nothing else, so much so that he failed to notice the diminishing stock in his bookshop and the consequent lack of custom. "Was there ever, before or since the year 1737", writes his biographer Edith Olivier, "another enthusiast for whom it was no drudgery, but a sustained passion of delight, to creep conscientiously word by word through every chapter of the Bible, and that not once only, but again and again?".

Although a remarkable feat, the concordance was not entirely without error. The Times recorded that Cruden left out Buz (brother of Huz) and Sneeze (put under Neeze). In fact, the name "Chloe" was missing until a revised edition was published in 1930.

See also
 Strong's Concordance
 Young's Analytical Concordance to the Bible

References

1737 books
Bible concordances
Christianity in Scotland
1737 in Scotland
Scottish books
King James Version
Caroline of Ansbach